Nizhnyaya Pechenga is a rural locality (a village) in Medvedevskoye Rural Settlement, Totemsky District, Vologda Oblast, Russia. The population was 37 as of 2002.

Geography 
Nizhnyaya Pechenga is located 57 km northeast of Totma (the district's administrative centre) by road. Mikhaylovka is the nearest rural locality.

References 

Rural localities in Tarnogsky District